Musa Eroğlu (born 1946) is a Turkish folk musician and bağlama virtuoso.

He was born in the Mut county district of Mersin. He is a Tahtacı. He completed his secondary education in Mut. He then started to perform Turkish folk dance and music. In 1965, he participated in Ankara Radio's exam but did not pass. In 1969, he released his first record "İkimiz Toprağa Girelim Elif".

Together with his wife whom he married in 1966, they have two daughters and one son.

Albums 

Musa Eroğlu has published at least 37 albums between 1975 and 2018. 

 1975 - A Kuzum, Yağmur Plak
 1977 - Yaralı Turnam, Özaydın Müzik
 1978 - Bu Dünya, Harika Kasetçilik
 1979 - Yaz Gelir, Şah Plak
 1983 - Muhabbet 1 (Arif Sağ ve Muhlis Akarsu ile birlikte), Şah Plak
 1984 - Muhabbet 2 (Arif Sağ ve Muhlis Akarsu ile birlikte), Şah Plak
 1985 - Muhabbet 3 (Muhlis Akarsu, Arif Sağ ve Yavuz Top ile birlikte), Şah Plak
 1986 - Muhabbet 4 (Arif Sağ ve Yavuz Top ile birlikte), Şah Plak
 1987 - Muhabbet 5 (Muhlis Akarsu, Arif Sağ ve Yavuz Top ile birlikte), Şah Plak
 1987 - Seher Oldu Ey Nigarım, Bey Plak
 1988 - Muhabbet 6 (Muhlis Akarsu ve Yavuz Top ile birlikte), Pınar Müzik (daha sonra Kalan Müzik yayınladı.)
 1988 - Yummayın Kirpiklerini, Aziz Plak
 1988 - Divane Gönlüm Benim, Aziz Plak
 1989 - Muhabbet 7 (Muhlis Akarsu ve Yavuz Top ile birlikte), Pınar Müzik (daha sonra Kalan Müzik yayınladı.)
 1990 - Bir Yanardağ Fışkırması, Majör Müzik
 1991 - Garip Yolcu, Net Ses 
 1992 - Benim Dünyam, Net Ses
 1993 - Kevser Irmağı / Sevda Yükü, Net Ses
 1994 - Yol Ver Dağlar, Duygu Müzik
 1994 - Bin Yıllık Yürüyüş 1, 2, Koda Müzik
 1994 - Musa Eroğlu 94, Net Ses
 1995 - Ömrüm Sana Doyamadım, Ajs Müzik
 1996 - Halil İbrahim / Kerbela Destanı, Duygu Müzik
 1996 - Bağlama Resital 1,2 (Arif Sağ ile birlikte), ASM
 1997 - Semahlarımız, Bema Prodüksiyon
 1998 - Musique Instrumentale D'Anatolie (Arif Sağ ile birlikte), ASM
 1998 - Kavimler Kapısı Anadolu, Duygu Müzik
 2000 - Bir Nefes Anadolu, Duygu Müzik
 2003 - Sele Verdim, Duygu Müzik
 2004 - Sazımızla Sözümüzle 2 (Güler Duman ile birlikte), Duygu Müzik
 2007 - Dedem Korkut, Duygu Müzik
 2010 - Armağan 1 (Yusuf Gül ile birlikte), Özdemir Plak
 2010 - Semahlar, Mod Müzik
 2012 - Zamansız Yağmur, Özdemir Plak
 2015 - Musa Eroğlu ile Bir Asır, Özdemir Plak
 2016 - Taşeli Türküleri, Özdemir Plak
 2017 - MUSA EROĞLU - MİHRİBAN
 2018 - Turnaların Göçü (Yeni Türküleriyle), Özdemir Plak

References

1946 births
Living people
Turkish folk musicians
Bağlama players